Futterman is the surname of:
 Dan Futterman (born 1967), American actor and screenwriter
 Joel Futterman (born 1946), American jazz pianist and curved soprano saxophonist
 Julius Futterman (1907–1981), American electronic engineer, developed the OTL amplifier
 Nika Futterman (born 1969), American voice actress
 Robert A. Futterman  (1928–1961), American real estate investor and author
 Robert K. Futterman (born 1958), American executive officer of Robert K. Futterman & Associates